Douglas Ralph Morgan ( 1920 – May 2009) was a Welsh rugby union, and professional rugby league footballer who played in the 1940s and 1950s.

Morgan was signed by Leeds from Swinton in October 1952. In September 1954, he was signed by Belle Vue Rangers, where he remained until the club folded a year later.

International honours
Morgan won three caps and was captain for Wales (RL) while at Swinton 1949–1950.

References

External links
(archived by web.archive.org) Biography at blackandambers.co.uk
History of Newport > The 1946–47 Season

1920s births
2009 deaths
Footballers who switched code
Place of birth missing
Place of death missing
Rugby league fullbacks
Rugby union fullbacks
Cross Keys RFC players
Newport RFC players
Swinton Lions players
Leeds Rhinos players
Broughton Rangers players
Wales national rugby league team captains
Wales national rugby league team players
Welsh rugby league players
Welsh rugby union players